Robert C. Cannon (June 10, 1917October 22, 2008) was an American lawyer and judge.  He served as presiding judge of the Wisconsin Court of Appeals in the Milwaukee-based District I court.  Earlier in his career, he was significantly involved in Major League Baseball, worked to bring the Milwaukee Brewers franchise to Milwaukee, and came within one vote of being elected Commissioner of Baseball.

Biography
Born in Milwaukee, Wisconsin, Cannon was married and had six children. In 1941, he graduated from Marquette University Law School. His father was Raymond Cannon, who served in the United States House of Representatives.  He died on October 22, 2008.

Baseball
Heavily involved in bringing the Seattle Pilots franchise (now the Milwaukee Brewers) to Milwaukee from Seattle, Washington.  He came within one vote of being elected Commissioner of Major League Baseball. Later, he worked as Legal Counsel to the Major League Baseball Players Association for six years.

Judicial career
Cannon was elected to the Milwaukee Civil Court in 1946. He joined the Wisconsin Court of Appeals in 1978, immediately becoming a Presiding Judge and remaining one until 1979. In 1981, he retired from full-time judicial duty but remained a reserve judge.

In August 1968, Fr. James Groppi led a demonstration outside of Judge Cannon’s Wauwatosa home over his membership in the Fraternal Order of the Eagles, which restricted its membership to whites only. Robed Klansmen turned out in counter protest. Other residents held signs saying such things as “Keep Tosa White.” Cannon told the press, “I will remain in the Eagles as long as I live.”

Electoral history

Wisconsin Court of Appeals (1978)

| colspan="6" style="text-align:center;background-color: #e9e9e9;"| General Election, April 3, 1984

References

|-

Lawyers from Milwaukee
Wisconsin Court of Appeals judges
Wisconsin lawyers
Milwaukee Brewers executives
Marquette University Law School alumni
1917 births
2008 deaths
20th-century American judges
20th-century American lawyers